Maguindanao, Maguindanaon or Magindanao is an Austronesian language spoken by a majority of the population of Maguindanao del Norte and Maguindanao del Sur in the Philippines. It is also spoken by sizable minorities in different parts of Mindanao such as the cities of Zamboanga, Davao, and General Santos, and the provinces of North Cotabato, Sultan Kudarat, South Cotabato, Sarangani, Zamboanga del Sur, Zamboanga Sibugay, as well as Metro Manila. This was the language of the historic Sultanate of Maguindanao (1520–1905), which existed before and during the Spanish colonial period from 1565 to 1898.

History
The Maguindanao language is the native language of the Maguindanao people of the province of Maguindanao located in the west of Mindanao island in the south of the Philippines. It was the language of the Sultanate of Maguindanao, which lasted until near the end of the Spanish colonial period in the late 19th century.

The earliest works on the language by a European were carried out by Jacinto Juanmartí, a Catalan priest of the Society of Jesus who worked in the Philippines in the second half of the 19th century. Aside from a number of Christian religious works in the language, Juanmartí also published a Maguindanao–Spanish/Spanish–Maguindanao dictionary and reference grammar in 1892. Shortly after sovereignty over the Philippines was transferred from Spain to the United States in 1898 as a result of the Spanish–American War, the American administration began publishing a number of works on the language in English, such as a brief primer and vocabulary in 1903, and a translation of Juanmartí's reference grammar into English in 1906.

A number of works about and in the language have since been published by both local and foreign authors.

Phonology

Vowels 

The vowels  and  only occur in loanwords from Spanish through Tagalog or Cebuano and from Malay.

Consonants 

The phonemes  and  only appear in loanwords. The sound  also appears an allophonic realization for the sequences  (e.g. 'stockings'); the sound  also appears as an allophone of  before voiced consonants.  can also be trilled .

The Laya (Raya) or lowland dialect of Maguindanao, spoken in and around Cotabato City, prefers the flapped r over l, while the more conservative upland variety spoken in Datu Piang and inland areas favors l.

Grammar

Pronouns

Personal pronouns
As in the Maranao language, Maguindanao pronouns can be also free or bound to the word/morpheme before it.

Numbers
Maguindanao numerals:

Colors

Phrases

Signs

Writing system
Maguindanao is written with the Latin script, and used to be written with the Jawi script. Among works on the language published by Jacinto Juanmartí, his sacred history  contains Maguindanao texts in both Jawi and the Latin script.

Latin

Jawi

See also

Languages of the Philippines
Maranao language
Iranun language

References

Bibliography

External links
Maguindanao at Wiktionary
Bansa.org Maguindanao Dictionary
 SEAlang Library Maguindanao Resources

Danao languages
Languages of Maguindanao del Norte
Languages of Maguindanao del Sur